Postelichus is a genus of long-toed water beetles in the family Dryopidae. There are at least four described species in Postelichus.

Species
These four species belong to the genus Postelichus:
 Postelichus confluentus (Hinton, 1935)
 Postelichus immsi (Hinton, 1937)
 Postelichus musgravei (Hinton, 1935)
 Postelichus productus (LeConte, 1852)

References

Further reading

 
 
 

Dryopidae
Articles created by Qbugbot